Renata Rinatovna Khuzina (born 15 May 1994 in Neftekamsk) is a Russian skeleton racer who competes on the Skeleton World Cup circuit.  She was the IBSF Junior World silver medalist in women's skeleton for 2017 in Sigulda, behind her teammate Yulia Kanakina, and finished 20th in the senior IBSF World Championships later that year.  Her personal coach is Faizov Rustem and she rides a Schneider sled.

References

External links
 

1994 births
Russian female skeleton racers
Living people
20th-century Russian women
21st-century Russian women